Yonggang-dong is a dong, neighbourhood of the Mapo-gu district in Seoul, South Korea.

History 
Yonggang-dong was named after Yonggang-myeon, Goyang-gun, and it was named according to the Fengshui Geography that Mapo River is like a dragon's head. Mapo-dong originated because of the existence of Maponaru, and on April 1, 1914, Gyeongseongbu abolished the five-member 8 exemption, and part of Mapo-dong was designated as Dohwa-dong, and others were made Mapo-dong. The name of Tojeong-dong is derived from the fact that Ji-ham Lee, famous for his secret of Tojeong, built a pavilion out of soil. On October 1, 1946, it became Yonggang-dong, Mapo-gu. On April 18, 1955, the name was changed to Gwanran-dong, and on May 18, 1970, it became Yonggang-dong again.

Dong prescribed by law 

 Yonggang-dong
 Tojeong-dong
 Mapo-dong
 Dohwa-dong
 Daeheung-dong
 Yeomni-dong

See also 
Administrative divisions of South Korea

References

External links
 Mapo-gu official website in English
 Map of Mapo-gu at the Mapo-gu official website
 Map of Mapo-gu at the Mapo-gu official website
 Yonggang-dong resident office website

Neighbourhoods of Mapo District